Warren Barnes (born May 6, 1985) is a former Canadian swimmer. He was a National Team Member, and University of Pittsburgh alumnus. He competed on the Canadian National Team from 2009-2012, and won the last race of his career at Canadian Nationals in 2013.

He is a five time National Champion in the breaststroke events. His first career win was in 2010, and he also set two Ontario records that year. His most notable accomplishment was his 4th-place finish at the Pan Am Games in Guadalajara, Mexico 2011. He was also named most valuable swimmer in Ontario in 2011, earning the Bob Pirie award. 
Warren now coaches Canada's next generation of swimmers at Region of Waterloo swim club (ROW swim club)

In 2014-15, he occasionally came into coach at Upper Canada College's Varsity Swim Team.

References 

1985 births
Living people
Canadian male breaststroke swimmers
Sportspeople from Scarborough, Toronto
Swimmers at the 2011 Pan American Games
Swimmers from Toronto
University of Pittsburgh alumni
Pan American Games competitors for Canada